Xenurobrycon is a genus of characins from tropical South America.

Species
There are currently 6 recognized species in this genus:
 Xenurobrycon coracoralinae C. L. R. Moreira, 2005
 Xenurobrycon heterodon S. H. Weitzman & S. V. Fink, 1985
 Xenurobrycon macropus G. S. Myers & P. Miranda-Ribeiro, 1945
 Xenurobrycon polyancistrus S. H. Weitzman, 1987
 Xenurobrycon pteropus S. H. Weitzman & S. V. Fink, 1985
 Xenurobrycon varii Mendonça, L. A. W. Peixoto, Dutra & Netto-Ferreira, 2016

References

Characidae
Freshwater fish genera
Taxa named by George S. Myers
Taxa named by Paulo de Miranda-Ribeiro
Freshwater fish of South America